Borris–Ileigh Gaelic Athletic Club is a Gaelic games club that is based in the village of Borrisoleigh, County Tipperary, Ireland. The club currently plays hurling and camogie in the county-wide and North division competitions of Tipperary GAA. It formerly participated in Mid Tipperary divisional competitions. It also plays Gaelic football at Junior and under-age levels. The club attracts members from the civil parish of Glenkeen which is co-extensive with the Catholic parish of Borrisoleigh and Ileigh.

History
"Borrisoleigh Gaelic Athletic Club" was founded in 1886. In 1948, this club merged with "Ileigh Hurling Club".

Hurling
Borrisoleigh reached the semifinal of the first Tipperary Senior Hurling Championship in 1887, a year after its foundation. In 1910 the club won the Tipperary Junior Hurling Championship, defeating Toomevara. The Borris and Ileigh clubs competed separately in the Mid and North divisions, and in 1947 Borrisoleigh defeated Kilruane to win the North Senior Hurling Championship, but lost in the county final.

The united Borris–Ileigh club won the Mid Senior final in 1949, beating Boerlahan, and went on to win the county title, beating Knockavilla–Donaskeigh by 4–6 to 2–1. They held the title in 1950, defeating Carrick Swans 2–7 to 2–3. A third county title came in 1953, when they beat Boherlahan 4–8 to 4–4. After a lean period in the 1960s and '70s Borris–Ileigh won three county SHC titles in the 1980s, along with the 1986 Munster and 1987 All-Ireland titles.

On 3 November 2019, Borris–Ileigh won their first Tipperary Championship since 1986 with a 1-15 to 1-12 win over Kiladangan in the final.	
On 24 November 2019, Borris-Ileigh won their second Munster Club Hurling Championship after a 1-12 to 1-11 win against Ballygunner in the final.	
On 5 January 2020, Borris–Ileigh reached the 2020 All-Ireland Senior Club Hurling Championship Final after a 1-21 to 1-14 win against St Thomas in the semi-finals.
In the final on 19 January, Borris–Ileigh lost to Ballyhale Shamrocks by 0-18 to 0-15.

Honours
All-Ireland Senior Club Hurling Championship (1)
 1987
 runners-up 2020
Tipperary Senior Hurling Championship (7)
 1949, 1950, 1953, 1981, 1983, 1986, 2019
 runners-up 1947, 2017
Munster Senior Club Hurling Championship (2)
 1986, 2019
 *** runners-up 1983
North Tipperary Senior Hurling Championship (15)
 (Borrisoleigh) 1947
 1950, 1951, 1952, 1953, 1955, 1972, 1973, 1976, 1981, 1983, 1988, 2005, 2007, 2017
Mid Tipperary Senior Hurling Championship (1)
 1949
Tipperary Junior A Hurling Championship (2)
 (Borrisoleigh) 1910, 1933
North Tipperary Junior A Hurling Championship (1) 
 1978
North Tipperary Junior A Football Championship (7)
 1960, 1991, 1994, 1996, 2001, 2004, 2008
Mid Tipperary Junior Hurling 'A' Championship (3)
 (Borrisoleigh) 1910, 1926, 1928
Tipperary Under-21 (A) Hurling Championship (3)
 1969, 1987, 1997
North Tipperary U-21 (A) Hurling Championship (4)
 1969, 1987, 1988, 1997
Tipperary U-21 (B) Hurling Championship (1)
 1995
North Tipperary U-21 (B) Hurling Championship (2)
 1995, 2015
Tipperary Minor (B) Hurling Championship (1)
 1985
North Tipperary Minor (B) Hurling Championship (3)
 1981, 1985, 2004
All Ireland 7-a-Side Championship (6)
 1976, 1978, 1987, 1997, 2000, 2015
    All  Ireland 7-a-side junior
Championship. (1)
   2015

Notable players
 Mick Cowan
 Jim Devaney
 Liam Devaney, Hurler of the Year 1961
 Jimmy Finn, captain of All Ireland winning Tipperary Senior Hurling team, 1951
 Pat Kavanagh (Kilkenny hurler)
 Conor Kenny (hurler) (Kildare)
 Paddy Kenny, captain of All Ireland winning Tipperary Minor Hurling team, 1947
 Sean Kenny, captain of All Ireland winning Tipperary Senior Hurling team, 1950
 Dan McCormack
 Brendan Maher, captain of All Ireland winning Tipperary Minor Hurling team, 2007, All Star, Young Hurler of the Year 2010, captain of All Ireland winning Tipperary Senior Hurling team, 2016
 Philip Maher, All Star
 Noel O'Dwyer
 Tommy O'Dwyer
 Jim Prior (hurler) (Dublin)
 Aidan Ryan, All Star
 Mick Ryan (Borris–Ileigh hurler)
 Bobby Ryan, captain of All Ireland winning Tipperary Senior Hurling team, 1989, All Star
 Ned Ryan
 Pat Ryan (Borris–Ileigh hurler)
 Philly Ryan
 Tim Ryan
 Conor Stakelum
 Richard Stakelum, captain of Munster Senior Championship winning Tipperary Hurling team, 1987 (the end of sixteen barren years for the county)
 Gerry Stapleton
 Paddy Stapleton
 Timmy Stapleton

See also
 Paddy Doyle (hurler), didn't play, coached Borris–Ileigh to 1987 All-Ireland Senior club Hurling Championship

Gaelic football
Borrisoleigh won the Mid Tipperary Senior Football Championship in 1910, defeating Upperchurch. The Borris-Ileigh club, in which hurling dominates, currently plays in the Junior championship and leagues.

Honours
Mid Tipperary Senior Football Championship (1)
 (Borrisoleigh) 1910
North Tipperary Junior 'A' Football Championship (7)
 1960, 1991, 1994, 1996, 2001, 2004, 2008
North Tipperary U-21 (A) Football Championship (1)
 1998
North Tipperary U-21 (B) Football Championship (2)
 1994, 1995
North Tipperary Minor (B) Football Championship (5)
 1993, 1996, 2000, 2006, 2009

Camogie
The Borris–Ileigh Camogie Club competes at Senior level and also fields Minor, Under-16, U-14, U-12 and U-8 teams.

Culture
The club also participates in Scór competitions.

Facilities
The club is planning to develop a community sports complex at its home grounds, which were extended with the purchase of adjoining land in 2012.

External links 
 Borris–Ileigh GAA club official site
 Tipperary GAA site
 Borris–Ileigh GAA site
 Tipperary GAA club sites
 Tipperary on Hoganstand.com

References

Gaelic games clubs in County Tipperary
Hurling clubs in County Tipperary
Borrisoleigh